Jake Andy Haberfield (born 18 June 1986) is a professional cricketer who played for the Victorian Bushrangers. On 2 December 2013, Haberfield was signed by the Melbourne Renegades Big Bash League franchise as their final signing for the second season, but did not play a  match for the side.

References

External links

1986 births
Living people
Australian cricketers
South Australia cricketers
Sportspeople from Townsville
Cricketers from Queensland